Nonoxynols also known as nonaethylene glycol or polyethylene glycol nonyl phenyl ether are mixtures of nonionic surfactants used as detergents, emulsifiers, wetting agents or defoaming agents. The most commonly discussed compound nonoxynol-9 is a spermicide, formulated primarily as a component of vaginal foams and creams. Nonoxynol was found to metabolize into free nonylphenol when administered to lab animals. Arkopal-N60, with on average 6 ethylene glycol units is a related used surfactant.

Production
Nonoxynols are produced by ethoxylation of alkylphenols and vary in the number of repeating ethoxy (oxy-1,2-ethanediyl) groups resulting in Nonoxynol-4, Nonoxynol-7, Nonoxynol-9, Nonoxynol-14, Nonoxynol-15, Nonoxynol-18, Nonoxynol-40,  Nonoxynol-30 and Nonoxynol-50. Other synonyms are polyethylene glycol (PEG)-7 Nonyl phenyl ether, PEG-14 Nonyl phenyl ether, PEG-18 Nonyl phenyl ether and PEG-50 Nonyl phenyl ether.
The precursor nonylphenol is derived from phenol and a mixture of nonenes.

Use
Nonoxynols have been used as detergents, emulsifiers and  wetting agents in cosmetics, including hair products, and  defoaming agents. Only nonoxynol-9 with 9 repeating ethoxy groups, has been used as a spermaticide, for vaginal foams and creams, and on condoms.

Toxicity concerns
Concerns about the environmental impact of these compounds has increased since the 1990s. These surfactants have a mild to medium estrogenic function. Consequently, this class of detergents has been effectively restricted for commercial "down-the-drain" applications in Europe, and these compounds are no longer used by U.S. laundry manufacturers. On January 14, 2016, the European Commission amended existing restriction on nonylphenol ethoxylates (NPE) under the Registration, Evaluation, Authorisation and Restriction of Chemicals (REACH) legislation, limiting NPE residues on textile articles to 0.01% by weight, effective February 3, 2021. Previously, the use of NPE was forbidden within the EU, but there was no limit on the level of NPE residue on imported articles.

On 13 August 2008, the Swedish newspaper Göteborg Posten (sv) reported finding high levels of the NPE in Björn Borg underwear. A 2011 investigation found residual levels of NPE in samples of clothing from 14 brands sold in the U.S., including Adidas, Uniqlo, Calvin Klein, H&M, Abercrombie & Fitch, Lacoste, Converse and Ralph Lauren.

References

External links
 J.K.G. Dondt, G. Gomppner, D. Richter (Eds) Soft matter: complex materials on mesoscopic scales - Schriften des Forschungszentrum Jülich, Vol. 10, 2002.

Non-ionic surfactants
Polyethers
Phenol ethers
Primary alcohols